Play Game: Awake is the first single album by South Korean girl group Weeekly. It was released on March 7, 2022, through IST Entertainment. The single album consists of three tracks, including the lead single "Ven Para". This is the last album to feature Jiyoon who left in June 1 2022 due to ongoing anxiety

Background 
On February 28, 2022, it was announced that Shin Ji-yoon would be taking a hiatus temporarily due to tension and anxiety, therefore she will not be participating in promotions. The group released Play Game: Awake on March 7, featuring "Ven Para" as the lead single.

Reception 
Rhian Daly of NME gave the album three stars out of five. Rhian described the lead single, "Ven Para" as "messy and jarring" but praised one of the verses as "a nice respite from the discordance".
"Solar" was said as "much more cohesive and powerful, but still struggles to really make its mark". "Where Is My Love?" was criticized for "missing that special spark" but complemented for its "soulful piece of soft pop".

Track listing

Charts

Release history

References 

2022 singles
Weeekly albums
Single albums